Luck's Incorporated was a food production company founded in Seagrove, North Carolina, in 1947, which produced a line of canned bean and other canned food products. For a period of time, it was one of the largest employers in the area and its canned food products were a staple in many Southern homes. It is a brand of Faribault Foods, after a divestment by ConAgra in 2010.

History 

The company was founded as the Mountain View Cannery in 1947 by Ivey B. Luck, Alfred Spencer & H. Clay Presnell. Spencer & Presnell later sold out to Luck and the establishment became known as Luck's. Luck's specialized in pinto beans and other canned vegetables and food products, employed many Seagrove and surrounding area families, and was a major buyer of vegetable, fruit, and poultry farms in the Randolph County Area and from around the region. Luck's canned food products were sold across much of the Southeast during the 1950s and is still a popular brand today.

Merged and Acquired 

In 1967, Luck's merged with American Home Products. In 2000, the food interests of American Home Products, known as International Home Foods, were acquired by ConAgra Foods.

In 2010, the brand was sold to Arizona Canning Company, a subsidiary of La Costeña, for US$14 million. In 2014, La Costeña acquired Faribault Foods and merged Arizona Canning into Faribault.

Luck's Headquarters and Cannery 

The original company headquarters and cannery is located at 798 State Highway 705 in Seagrove, North Carolina. For a period of time Luck's also operated a cannery in Aberdeen, North Carolina.

The Luck's cannery in Seagrove was closed by ConAgra in 2002. The location was reopened eight months later and operated by Seagrove Foods, Inc., a fully independent company.

Currently, some of the warehouse space is used for local community events.

See also 
 Seagrove, North Carolina

References 

Food product brands
Randolph County, North Carolina
Food manufacturers of the United States
Food and drink companies established in 1947
Companies based in North Carolina
1947 establishments in North Carolina
1967 mergers and acquisitions